Tinel Petre (born 14 March 1974) is a retired Romanian football defender.

Honours
Dinamo București
Liga I: 1999–00
Cupa României: 1999–00, 2000–01
Politehnica Iași
Liga II: 2003–04

References

1974 births
Living people
Romanian footballers
Liga I players
Liga II players
FC Progresul București players
AFC Rocar București players
FC Dinamo București players
FC Brașov players
FC Argeș Pitești players
FC Politehnica Iași (1945) players
FC Astra Giurgiu players
Association football defenders